Meydancık (literally "little (city) square") is a Turkish place name and may mean:

Meydancık, Baskil
Meydancık, Şavşat, a village in the Şavşat district of Artvin Province
Meydancık Castle, ruins of a castle in Gülnar district of Mersin Province